Eugen Ştefănescu (born 15 May 1904, date of death unknown) was a Romanian bobsledder. He competed in the four-man event at the 1928 Winter Olympics.

References

1904 births
Year of death missing
Romanian male bobsledders
Olympic bobsledders of Romania
Bobsledders at the 1928 Winter Olympics
Place of birth missing